Paired related homeobox 1 is a protein that in humans is encoded by the PRRX1 gene.

Function 

The DNA-associated protein encoded by this gene is a member of the paired family of homeobox proteins localized to the nucleus. The protein functions as a transcription coactivator, enhancing the DNA-binding activity of serum response factor, a protein required for the induction of genes by growth and differentiation factors. The protein regulates muscle creatine kinase, indicating a role in the establishment of diverse mesodermal muscle types. Alternative splicing yields two isoforms that differ in abundance and expression patterns.

Role in mesenchymal stem cell differentiation 

Prrx1 expression is restricted to the mesoderm during embryonic development, and both Prrx1 and Prrx2 are expressed in mesenchymal tissues in adult mice. Mice that lack both Prrx1 and Prrx2 have profound defects in mesenchymal cell differentiation in the craniofacial region. Several  recent studies demonstrate that PRRX1 can regulate differentiation of mesenchymal precursors. For example, PRRX1 inhibits adipogenesis by activating transforming growth factor-beta (TGF-beta) signaling, and also acts downstream of tumor necrosis factor-alpha to inhibit osteoblast differentiation.

References

Further reading

External links 
 

Transcription factors